Acacia dietrichiana, commonly known as Dietrich wattle, is a shrub belonging to the genus Acacia and the subgenus Phyllodineae that is endemic to Queensland.

Description
When it blooms between June and July it produces golden spherical flower-heads followed by brown seed pods.

Taxonomy
The species was first formally described by the botanist Ferdinand von Mueller in 1882 as a part of the work Definitions of some new Australian plants as published in the journal Southern Science Record. It was reclassified as Racosperma dietrichianum by Leslie Pedley in 1987 then returned to the genus Acacia in 2001. The only other synonym is Acacia juncifolia var. planifolia.

Distribution
The tree is found in inland areas of northern and central Queensland from the White Mountains in the north down to around Tambo in the south where it grows in rocky and shallow sandy soils.

See also
 List of Acacia species

References

dietrichiana
Flora of Queensland
Taxa named by Ferdinand von Mueller
Plants described in 1882